David Harrer (born 24 April 1990) is an Austrian footballer who plays for SC Bruck/Mur.

Career

Bruck/Mur
Ahead of the 2019/20 season, Harrer joined SC Bruck/Mur.

References

External links

1990 births
Living people
People from Bruck an der Mur
Austrian footballers
Austrian Football Bundesliga players
2. Liga (Austria) players
Austrian Regionalliga players
Swiss Challenge League players
Kapfenberger SV players
FC Vaduz players
Austrian expatriate footballers
Austrian expatriate sportspeople in Liechtenstein
Expatriate footballers in Liechtenstein
SC Wiener Neustadt players
Association football midfielders
Footballers from Styria